Hiberius (fl. 1st century AD) was an imperial freedman who assumed the duties of praefectus or governor of Roman Egypt for a few months in AD 32, from the premature death of Vitrasius Pollio to the arrival from Rome of Aulus Avilius Flaccus. He may have been a slave to Antonia Minor, wife of Drusus.

Besides Hiberus, only one other freedman served as governor of Egypt, Marcus Aurelius Epagathus.

References 

1st-century Romans
1st-century Roman governors of Egypt
Emperor's slaves and freedmen
Roman governors of Egypt